Simeon Heinz (born 28 January 1977) is a German professional darts player who plays in Professional Darts Corporation events.

He made his PDC European Tour debut in the 2018 Austrian Darts Open, but was defeated 6–1 by Scott Taylor.

References

External links

1977 births
Living people
German darts players
Professional Darts Corporation associate players